El Dorado Springs or El Dorado Springs may refer to:

Eldorado Springs, Arkansas
Eldorado Springs, Colorado
El Dorado Springs, Missouri